Veeranakavu  is a village in Thiruvananthapuram district in the state of Kerala, India.

Demographics
At the 2001 India census, Veeranakavu had a population of 25813 with 12644 males and 13169 females.

References

Villages in Thiruvananthapuram district